The Niue Treaty on Cooperation in Fisheries Surveillance and Law Enforcement in the South Pacific Region or Niue Treaty is a multilateral treaty of members of the Pacific Islands Forum Fisheries Agency to enhance their ability to enforce effectively their fisheries laws, and deter breaches.

Under Article XIII a State which is not a Party to the Forum Fisheries Agency Convention may also accede to the Treaty, if all Parties agree.

Niue Treaty Multilateral Subsidiary Agreement

Bilateral Subsidiary Agreements have been made in the past between individual Niue Treaty signatories in order to give effect to certain Treaty provisions. However, a comprehensive Multilateral Subsidiary Agreement (NTMSA)  for strengthening implementation of the Niue Treaty was agreed and finalised for signature in Honiara on 2 November 2012.

The first country to sign the NTMSA was the Republic of Palau on 9 November 2012. The Multilateral Subsidiary Agreement needs 4 instruments of ratifications, acceptance or approval to come into force.

Ratifications
The treaty was signed by (or on behalf of) 17 states/territories; as of 2013, 14 had ratified the treaty:

See also
Nauru Agreement

References

External links
Treaty text
Ratifications
Treaty and Multilateral Subsidiary Agreement text

1993 in the environment
Treaties concluded in 1992
Treaties entered into force in 1993
1992 in Niue
1993 in Niue
Politics of Oceania
Fisheries treaties
Treaties of Australia
Treaties of the Cook Islands
Treaties of Fiji
Treaties of Kiribati
Treaties of the Marshall Islands
Treaties of the Federated States of Micronesia
Treaties of Nauru
Treaties of Niue
Treaties of Palau
Treaties of Papua New Guinea
Treaties of Samoa
Treaties of the Solomon Islands
Treaties of Tonga
Treaties of Vanuatu
Treaties extended to Tokelau